Zhuravka is a rural locality (a selo) in Podkolodnovskoye Rural Settlement, Bogucharsky District, Voronezh Oblast, Russia. The population was 552 as of 2010. There are 13 streets.

Geography 
Zhuravka is located on the left bank of the Don River, 18 km north of Boguchar (the district's administrative centre) by road. Kovylny is the nearest rural locality.

References 

Rural localities in Bogucharsky District